Jakub Tomanica (born 17 January 1990) is a Slovak football midfielder who currently plays for OFK Teplička nad Váhom.

He previously played for Gambrinus Liga club FC Baník Ostrava.

References

External links 
at fcb.cz

1990 births
Living people
Slovak footballers
Association football midfielders
MŠK Žilina players
FK Iskra Borčice players
FC Baník Ostrava players
Czech First League players
Salthill Devon F.C. players